Al-Ḥārith ibn Jabalah ([Flavios] Arethas in Greek sources; Khālid ibn Jabalah in later Islamic sources), was a king of the Ghassanids, a pre-Islamic Arab Christian tribe who lived on the eastern frontier of the Byzantine Empire. For his services to Byzantium, he was made patrikios and vir gloriosissimus.

Biography

Early life
Harith was the son of Jabalah IV (Gabalas in Greek sources) and brother of Abu Karab (Abocharabus), phylarch of Palaestina Salutaris. He became ruler of the Ghassanids and phylarch of Arabia Petraea and Palaestina Secunda probably in 528, following the death of his father in the Battle of Thannuris. Soon after he was raised by the Byzantine emperor Justinian I (r. 527–565), in the words of the historian Procopius, "to the dignity of king", becoming the overall commander of all the Empire's Arab allies in the East with the title  ("patrician and phylarch of the Saracens"). His actual area of control, however, may initially have been limited to the northeastern part of Byzantium's Arab frontier. At the time, the Byzantines and their Arab allies were engaged in the Iberian War against the Sasanian Empire and their Arab clients, the Lakhmids, and Justinian's move was designed to create a counterpart to the powerful Lakhmid ruler, Mundhir, who controlled the Arab tribes allied to the Persians.

Military career

In this capacity, Harith fought on behalf of the Byzantines in all their numerous wars against Persia. Already in 528 he was one of the commanders sent in a punitive expedition against Mundhir. In 529, he helped suppress the wide-scale Samaritan revolt, capturing 20,000 boys and girls whom he sold as slaves. It was perhaps Harith's successful participation in this conflict that led Justinian to promote him to supreme phylarch. It is possible that he took part with his men in the Byzantine victory in the Battle of Dara in 530, although no source explicitly mentions him. In 531, he led a 5000-strong Arab contingent in the Battle of Callinicum. Procopius, a source hostile to the Ghassanid ruler, states that the Arabs, stationed on the Byzantine right, betrayed the Byzantines and fled, costing them the battle. John Malalas, however, whose record is generally more reliable, reports that while some Arabs indeed fled, Harith stood firm. The charge of treason leveled by Procopius against Harith seems to be further undermined by the fact that, unlike Belisarius, he was retained in command and was active in operations around Martyropolis later in the year.

In 537/538 or 539, he clashed with Mundhir of the Lakhmids over grazing rights on the lands south of Palmyra, near the old Strata Diocletiana. According to later accounts by al-Tabari, the Ghassanid ruler invaded Mundhir's territory and carried off rich booty. The Sasanian emperor, Khosrow I (r. 531–579), used this dispute as a pretext for restarting hostilities with the Byzantines, and renewed war broke out in 540. In the campaign of 541, Harith and his men, accompanied by 1200 Byzantines under generals John the Glutton and Trajan, were sent by Belisarius into a raid into Assyria. The expedition was successful, penetrated far into enemy territory and gathered much plunder. At some point, however, the Byzantine contingent was sent back, and subsequently Harith failed to either meet up with or inform Belisarius of his whereabouts. According to Procopius's account, this, in addition to the outbreak of a disease among the army, forced Belisarius to withdraw. Procopius further alleges that this was done deliberately so that the Arabs would not have to share their plunder. In his Secret History, however, Procopius gives a different account of Belisarius's inaction, completely unrelated to the Ghassanid ruler. In , Harith was involved in armed conflict with another Arab phylarch, al-Aswad, known in Greek as Asouades.

From  on, while the two great empires were at peace in Mesopotamia after the truce of 545, the conflict between their Arab allies continued. In a sudden raid, Mundhir captured one of Harith's sons and had him sacrificed. Soon after, however, the Lakhmids suffered a heavy defeat in a pitched battle between the two Arab armies. The conflict continued, with Mundhir staging repeated raids into Syria. In one of these raids, in June 554, Harith met him in the decisive battle of Yawm Halima (the "Day of Halima"), celebrated in pre-Islamic Arab poetry, near Chalcis, at which the Lakhmids were defeated. Mundhir fell in the field, but Harith also lost his eldest son Jabalah.

In November 563, Harith visited Emperor Justinian in Constantinople, to discuss his succession and the raids against his domains by the Lakhmid ruler Amr ibn Hind, who was eventually bought off with subsidies. He certainly left a vivid impression in the imperial capital, not least by his physical presence: John of Ephesus records that years later, the Emperor Justin II (r. 565–578), who had descended into madness, was frightened and went to hide himself when he was told "Arethas is coming for you".

Death
When al-Harith died in 569 during a supposed earthquake, he was succeeded by his son al-Mundhir III ibn al-Harith ( Flávios Alamúndaros in Byzantine sources). Taking advantage of this, the new Lakhmid ruler Qabus ibn al-Mundhir launched an attack, but was decisively defeated.

Religious policies
In contrast to his Byzantine overlords, Harith was a staunch Miaphysite and rejected the Council of Chalcedon. Throughout his rule, al-Harith supported the anti-Chalcedonian tendencies in the region of Syria, presiding over church councils and engaging in theology, contributing actively to the Miaphysite church's revival during the sixth century. Thus in 542, following two decades of persecutions which had decapitated the Miaphysite leadership, he appealed for the appointment of new Miaphysite bishops in Syria to the Empress Theodora, whose own Miaphysite leanings were well-known. Theodora then appointed Jacob Baradaeus and Theodore as bishops. Jacob in particular would prove a very capable leader, converting pagans and greatly expanding and strengthening the organization of the Miaphysite church.

References

Sources

569 deaths
6th-century Ghassanid kings
Harith 05
6th-century Christians
Year of birth unknown
Harith 05
Patricii
Generals of Justinian I
People of the Roman–Sasanian Wars
6th-century Arabs
Arabs in the Roman Empire
Iberian War
Arab Christians